Ecopower is a Belgian cooperative founded in 1991, financing renewable energy projects in Flanders.

History 
Since the liberalisation of the energy market in Flanders (July 2003) Ecopower became a supplier of green electricity produced in Belgium. At the end of 2010 1% of the Flemish households were supplied by Ecopower. It inspired other energy cooperatives across Europe.

Activities 
The cooperative buys and builds renewable electricity units, such as wind turbines and water turbines, in Belgium. Projects in recent years include the placement of wind turbines in Eeklo, Gistel and Ghent, and the placement of hydroelectric turbines in Rotselaar, Hoegaarden and Overijse. In 2020, Ecopower and ECoOB (another cooperative) initiated a solar-energy project in Leuven, by building solar installations on 10 public roofs and offering citizens the opportunity to become co-owners.

The cooperative claims 50000 members in 2017. 40 % of Ecopower clients have installed solar panels on their buildings.

Ecopower is member of the Belgium group of renewable cooperatives REScoop.be and the European group of renewable cooperatives REScoop.eu.

Ecopower has the Parque Eólico Chiloé project in Chiloé Island, southern Chile.

References

Electric power companies of Belgium
Energy cooperatives
Cooperatives in Belgium
Renewable electricity